Doctors is a British medical soap opera which began broadcasting on BBC One on 26 March 2000. Set in the fictional West Midlands town of Letherbridge, the soap follows the lives of the staff and patients of the Mill Health Centre and the Best Practice, two fictional NHS doctor's surgeries. The following is a list of characters that first appeared in Doctors in 2005 and 2006, by order of first appearance. All characters are introduced by the programme's executive producer, Will Trotter. Adrian Lewis Morgan debuted as Jimmi Clay in September 2005 and has gone on to be the longest-serving cast member on Doctors. He was followed by his wife, Amanda (Emma Samms). Jaye Griffiths joined in January 2006 as doctor Elizabeth Croft. Nick West (Michael McKell) then began appearing in March 2006. Receptionist Donna Parmar (Martha Howe-Douglas) then debuted in April 2006. Donnaleigh Bailey joined as nurse Michelle Corrigan in June 2006, who was followed by doctor Joe Fenton (Stephen Boxer) in September of that year, as well as Will Hurran (Joe McMullen). Additionally, multiple other characters appeared throughout the year.

Jimmi Clay

Dr. Jimmi Clay, portrayed by Adrian Lewis Morgan, first appeared on 5 September 2005. Having appeared continuously since, Morgan has gone on to become the programme's longest serving cast member. He joined the cast shortly after his role in Holby City had ended; he was a fan of the soap and was excited to audition for a regular part. Producers introduced the character's wife, Amanda (Emma Samms), shortly after his arrival, and he later established relationships with detective Eva Moore (Angela Lonsdale) and Cherry Malone (Sophie Abelson), the latter of whom he married.

After "a bit of a lull" regarding his storylines, Jimmi became the focus of a major storyline in 2019 which sees him wrongfully arrested and imprisoned for several months. Morgan was excited to be given the storyline as it felt different for himself and the soap itself. Morgan has received several award nominations for his portrayal of Jimmi, including Best Male Dramatic Performance at the British Soap Awards, and in 2020, he was announced as the winner of the Male Acting Performance award at the RTS Midlands Awards.

Amanda Vardalis

Amanda Vardalis (also Clay), portrayed by Emma Samms, initially appeared between 14 October and 9 December 2005, before returning for a brief stint from 27 April to 30 May 2018. Amanda was introduced as the older wife of Jimmi Clay (Adrian Lewis Morgan) and is a complementary therapist. Samms initially found the age difference between the two characters flattering until she learned that other characters were scripted to show their disbelief at Jimmi being married to an older woman. Jimmi and Amanda's marriage is strained upon Amanda's introduction and she allows him to  get with other women since she believes that this will make him stay with her. Amanda discovers a lump on her breast, and after Jimmi learns and pushes her to see a doctor, she gets told that the lump is benign. However, she lies to Jimmi and says that the lump is cancerous for his attention and sympathy. Jimmi leaves her after he discovers the truth.

Samms reprised the role in 2018 when Amanda returns to Letherbridge following the death of her recent husband. She said to Inside Soap that Amanda initially wants to see how Jimmi is doing and does not let him know she is back straight away. Samms explained: "Amanda is actually in a very desperate place, and she needs help." It eventually emerges that she is in a dispute with her dead husband's children over his will. Despite her success in American series following her exit, Samms "jumped at the chance" to return to Doctors since she enjoyed her initial stint on the soap, particularly working with Morgan. The producers promised Samms that she would be working with Morgan again, since he was the only cast member still in the series from her original stint. She also filmed scenes with Dido Miles, who portrays Emma Reid, who she said was "welcoming and absolutely delightful" and wished she could have filmed more scenes with.

Elizabeth Croft

Dr. Elizabeth Croft, portrayed by Jaye Griffiths, first appeared on 3 January 2006 and made her final appearance on 13 April 2006. Elizabeth was introduced to the Mill Health Centre as a doctor who had previously worked in poor parts of Asia. Due to her experiences there, Elizabeth is often shown to be short and up-front with patients who she sees to be wasting NHS time. As soon as she begins working at the Mill, she immediately surprises and irritates her colleagues with how frank she is. On her BBC Online profile, Elizabeth was described as a "spiky, abrupt character" who cannot stand office politics. It also noted that she is "ambitious and uses her dark sense of humour to push herself forward".

After she has a brief fling with Nick West (Michael McKell), she becomes pregnant. She keeps the pregnancy a secret and eventually has an abortion. However, Nick discovers the truth and he is angered and devastated to learn of the abortion. Mac McGuire (Christopher Timothy) offers Elizabeth a chance to go into partnership with him at the Mill, but not wanting to stay around and cause more upset for Nick, she declines and leaves Letherbridge.

For her role as Elizabeth, Griffiths received a nomination for Sexiest Female at the 2006 British Soap Awards.

Nick West

Dr. Nick West, portrayed by Michael McKell, first appeared on 6 March 2006 and made his final appearance on 8 October 2008. Nick's BBC Online profile stated that he had an emotionally troubled backstory prior to his first appearance. It included misdiagnosing a patient who then died and being suspended by the General Medical Council and forced to retrain as a doctor. His wife also had a miscarriage after years of struggling to get pregnant. Eventually, their marriage broke down and throughout his tenure on Doctors, Nick is shown to be "deeply affected by the guilt" of both the patient's death and the death of his child. Due to his suspension, Nick worries about complicated cases and always seeks a second opinion from his colleagues.

Nick is shown to be a very active person who is up for an adventure, with his hobbies including climbing mountains and playing rugby. However, he becomes involved in a car accident which leaves him paralysed from the waist down and he "rethinks his life". After he has a brief fling with Elizabeth Croft (Jaye Griffiths), she becomes pregnant. She keeps the pregnancy a secret and eventually has an abortion. However, Nick discovers the truth and he is angered and devastated to learn of the abortion. Not wanting to stay around and cause more upset for Nick, she declines and leaves Letherbridge.

For his role as Nick, McKell received nominations for Sexiest Male at the 2006, 2007 and 2008 British Soap Awards. His exit storyline later saw a nomination at the 2009 ceremony.

Donna Parmar

Donna Parmar, portrayed by Martha Howe-Douglas, first appeared on 26 April 2006 and made her final appearance on 11 May 2007. She was introduced as a receptionist at the Mill Health Centre and is shown to be efficient and good at her job. On her BBC Online profile, it stated that Donna has "extremely good instincts about people". She can see when somebody is a blagger and warns the medical staff about them. Donna can also see when someone is ill but hiding it. Her profile explained that Donna is "a little too interested in the workings at the Mill Health Centre" and she was shown to be a fiery character in the soap, with scenes of her losing temper and getting official warnings from practice manager Julia Parsons (Diane Keen).

Donna takes her job at the Mill after her son, Taran (Krishna Odedra), begins at school. She has difficulty persuading her husband, Ash (Simon Nagra), to let her go back to work but convinces him. She was described as a devoted wife and mother who had embraced her husband's Hinduism. When she learns that her son is being bullied and that the child's mother is a patient at the Mill, she finds the mother's medical notes. The files state that his mother is an alcoholic and is suspected of abusing her son. Donna realises that the child is being abused and gives the notes to his father, hoping he would use them as evidence in his battle for custody, but when Julia learns what Donna has done, she sacks Donna for breaking patient confidentiality. Her final day at the Mill was described as "a sad day".

For her role as Donna, Howe-Douglas received nominations for Best Comedy Performance and Best Newcomer at the 2007 British Soap Awards.

Michelle Corrigan

Michelle Corrigan, portrayed by Donnaleigh Bailey, first appeared on 8 June 2006 and made her final appearance on 13 August 2010. She was introduced as a nurse hired at the fictional Mill Health Centre to replace Faith Walker (Eva Fontaine), who is diagnosed with retinitis pigmentosa and can no longer work as a nurse. The BBC described Michelle as an enthusiastic and confident character who "rattles cages and shout the odds". Despite her teasing and michevious ways, Michelle is shown to be skilled with patients and has good instincts.

During her time on the series, Bailey felt that she constantly received great storylines. These included her friendship with Ruth Pearce (Selina Chilton) becoming complicated by Ruth's bad mental health, learning that she has been in an incestuous relationship with her half-brother, her tumultuous relationship with mother Vera (Doña Croll) and leaving the Mill to work as a military nurse. For her portrayal of the role, Bailey received two nominations for the British Soap Award for Best Actress, as well as a nomination for Best Daytime Star at the Inside Soap Awards.

Joe Fenton

Dr. Joe Fenton, portrayed by Stephen Boxer, first appeared on 4 September 2006 and made his final appearance on 9 December 2010. He was introduced as the uncle of established character Daniel Granger (Matthew Chambers) when he starts as a fellow doctor at the Mill Health Centre. On his BBC Online profile, he was described as "absent-minded and a bit of a ditherer" but it noted Joe's skill for weighing things up and never losing focus. Joe is shown to put himself out to help other people and gives people the impression that he "needs to be liked" by them. His profile also highlighted Joe's childish sense of humour, irreverence and being absurd.

His teenage daughter, Emily Fenton (Rachael St. Rose/Florence Hoath), is introduced alongside and Joe's backstory involving his divorce from wife Annie is explored. It reveals that Joe had a tendency to get his priorities wrong and it caused the breakdown of his marriage. After Emily is diagnosed with a serious heart condition, Joe moves to Boston to be with her. His initial final scenes aired in late 2008, but he returns on a visit in 2010, where he hires Ruth Pearce (Selina Chilton).

For his portrayal of Joe, Boxer was nominated for the British Soap Award for Best Actor in 2007 and 2008.

Will Hurran

Will Hurran, initially portrayed by Jack McMullen, first appeared in an episode broadcast on 6 September 2006. He was introduced as the nephew of established character Jimmi Clay (Adrian Lewis Morgan). He returned in 2018, with the role having been recast to Robin Morrissey. He is reintroduced as a nurse who works in Liverpool. In Liverpool, Will witnesses Adrian Coleman (Mark Noble) molest a patient by groping her. Will tells Steph Lynn (Tara Wells) about what he saw, but as Adrian is a clinical lead in the hospital, she tries to discourage Will from taking it higher. Will calls Jimmi for advice, and Jimmi is shocked when Will turns up on his doorstep, and the pair catch up. Will does not know Jimmi has obsessive–compulsive disorder (OCD) and his messy habits annoy Jimmi.

Will introduces Jimmi to his girlfriend, Erin Anderson (Laura Ainsworth), but when she flirts with Jimmi, he begins to suspect they are not a real couple and that Will is gay. The pair stay at Emma Reid's (Dido Miles) bed and breakfast and Emma tells Jimmi that she believes that Will and Erin are a real couple. However, Will later reveals that he is gay and that Erin is his best friend. After a long shift, Will goes back to Jimmi's house and leaves his belongings scattered around, not knowing Jimmi has just cleaned. Jimmi snaps at Will, who makes fun of Jimmi for cleaning so much. Jimmi opens up about his OCD and Will agrees to take more consideration with the house. Will tells Jimmi that he is going on a date, who is shocked to learn that Will is seeing Ben Galadima (Michael Fatogun), Jimmi's colleague. Will and Ben begin a relationship, but when Ben will not disclose what he is doing in the afternoon, Will surprises him. However, he accidentally outs Ben to his mother. Will informs Ben that he cannot be with somebody who is ashamed of their sexuality and the pair break up. He then returns to Liverpool.

Other characters

References

Doctors
Doctors
2005
, Doctors
, Doctors